Arkady Dokhoyan (born 12 August 1977) is an Armenian football player. He has played for Armenia national team.

National team statistics

References

1977 births
Living people
Armenian footballers
Armenia international footballers
FC Urartu players
FC Mika players
Armenian Premier League players
Association football defenders